Gravy Train is an American brand of dog food, currently owned by the J.M. Smucker Company after it acquired Big Heart Pet Brands in 2015.

Originally developed by General Foods, the Gravy Train brand was introduced in 1959 and trademarked in 1960. It was the first brand of dog food to have a brown gravy form when warm water is added to the dry kibble, mixing with the kibble's powder coating. The gravy is intended to make the food more palatable. The advertising catchphrase was "the gravy taste dogs can't wait to finish".

History 

Products under the "Gravy Train" brand were originally produced and marketed by General Foods, as part of its Gaines division which included Gaines Meal, Gaines-Burgers as well as Prime Choice and Top Choice.

In 2014, Big Heart Pet Brands, the pet food division of Del Monte Foods, became an independent company, taking over rights to the Gravy Train brand. In March 2015, it was announced that J.M. Smucker had completed the acquisition of Big Heart Pet Brands and its brands portfolio. Big Heart had 2,500 employees at the moment of the purchase. J.M. Smucker was best known for its jams, jellies, coffee, and other people food, committed to pay $5.8 billion cash and stock deal for the acquisition. Big Heart was the largest pet food manufacturer in the U.S. by then.

Pentobarbital detection in 2018
After pentobarbital—a barbiturate used for euthanasia of dogs, cats and horses—caused the death of a dog on New Year's Eve of 2016, a wide range of pet food brands were tested by WJLA-TV of Washington, D.C., partnered with Ellipse Analytics. The brand that most consistently was found to contain pentobarbital was Gravy Train dog food.

Out of 15 cans of Gravy Train dog food that were tested, 60% tested positive for pentobarbital. The source was identified as likely to be that animals that had been euthanized with pentobarbital had been used for making the dog food. While the levels detected were not considered lethal, the drug is not legally permitted at any concentration in pet food. After declining an on-camera interview, the U.S. FDA stated that it would "investigate the matter and take appropriate enforcement action".

Nutritional info 
Gravy Train primarily consists of byproducts from corn, wheat and soybeans, cellulose gum (the active ingredient that creates the gravy), bone meal, vitamin and mineral supplementation, artificial colors, BHA and rosemary.

References

External links
 
 Gravy Train TV commercial at the Duke University Libraries

Dog food brands
Del Monte Foods brands
General Foods
The J.M. Smucker Co. brands
1959 establishments in the United States